Chalciope alcyona is a moth of the family Noctuidae first described by Herbert Druce in 1888. It is found in the south Pacific, including Fiji, New Guinea, New Caledonia and Australia.

The larvae can become a pest on Oryza sativa.

References

Catocalinae